Corey Nelson (born April 22, 1992) is a former American football inside linebacker. He was drafted by the Denver Broncos in the seventh round of the 2014 NFL Draft. He played college football at Oklahoma.

Professional career

Denver Broncos
Nelson was drafted by the Denver Broncos in the seventh round, 242nd overall, in the 2014 NFL Draft.

2014 season
Nelson played all 16 regular-season games his rookie year and totaled 13 tackles, one pass defensed, and four special-teams stops.

2015 season
In the 2015 season, Nelson played all 16 regular-season games and totaled 10 tackles, one sack, and seven special-teams stops.

On February 7, 2016, Nelson was part of the Broncos team that won Super Bowl 50. In the game, he recorded one tackle as the Broncos defeated the Carolina Panthers by a score of 24–10.

2016 season
In the 2016 season, Nelson played in all 16 games with five starts recording a career-high 67 tackles and five passes defensed.

2017 season
On October 21, 2017, Nelson was placed on injured reserve after having surgery on a torn bicep.

Philadelphia Eagles
On March 14, 2018, Nelson signed a one-year deal with the Philadelphia Eagles. He was released on August 26, 2018.

Atlanta Falcons
On September 10, 2018, Nelson was signed by the Atlanta Falcons. He was released on September 22, 2018.

Tampa Bay Buccaneers
On January 3, 2019, Nelson signed a reserve/future contract with the Tampa Bay Buccaneers. He was released during final roster cuts on August 30, 2019.

Denver Broncos (second stint)
On September 2, 2019, Nelson was re-signed by the Denver Broncos. In Week 8, Nelson suffered a torn biceps and was ruled out for the remainder of the season.

Carolina Panthers
After becoming a free agent in March 2020, Nelson had a tryout with the Carolina Panthers on August 19, 2020.

Comedic Mixup
In January 2021, a link to the small YouTube channel "Corey NELSON" (Not the NFL player), a 15 year old boy, was mistakenly posted in place of a link to the real Corey Nelson's twitter. It is unknown how this mistake was made, but it brought comedic value. However, over time this brought attention to the small channel, getting the unknown schoolboy to 1.3K views at one point. *

References

External links 
 Oklahoma Sooners bio

1992 births
Living people
Players of American football from Dallas
American football linebackers
Oklahoma Sooners football players
Denver Broncos players
Philadelphia Eagles players
Atlanta Falcons players
Tampa Bay Buccaneers players